Kaela Davis (born March 15, 1995) is an American professional basketball player for the Phoenix Mercury of the Women's National Basketball Association (WNBA). She played college basketball for Georgia Tech before transferring to the University of South Carolina. She has also played for the Dallas Wings, Atlanta Dream, Chicago Sky, and the Seattle Storm in the WNBA.

College career
After helping lead South Carolina to the NCAA Championship, Davis opted to enter the 2017 WNBA draft. She was drafted 10th overall by the Dallas Wings.

Georgia Tech statistics
Source

Professional career
On August 10, 2018, Davis signed with the Perth Lynx for the 2018–19 WNBL season. However, due to suffering with vertigo, she was unable to travel to Perth and thus the Lynx released Davis from her contract on September 4.

In August 2020, it was announced that Davis had reached a deal with the Atlanta Dream.

Davis signed a hardship contract with the Seattle Storm on May 13, 2022.

On July 21, 2022, Davis signed a 7-Day Hardship Contract with the Phoenix Mercury

WNBA career statistics

Regular season

|-
| align="left" | 2017
| align="left" | Dallas
| 33 || 0 || 15.5 || .389 || .429 || .754 || 1.4 || 1.0 || 0.5 || 0.1 || 1.5 || 6.1
|-
| align="left" | 2018
| align="left" | Dallas
| 27 || 6 || 16.8 || .347 || .244 || .641 || 2.0 || 1.4 || 0.3 || 0.0 || 1.3 || 5.0
|-
| align="left" | 2019
| align="left" | Dallas
| 33 || 16 || 19.2 || .329 || .314 || .879 || 2.2 || 2.1 || 0.5 || 0.2 || 2.2 || 6.0
|-
| align="left" | 2020
| align="left" | Atlanta
| 2 || 0 || 1.0 || .000 || .000 || .000 || 0.0 || 0.0 || 0.0 || 0.0 || 0.0 || 0.0
|-
| align="left" | 2022
| align="left" | Chicago
| 1 || 0 || 10.0 || .000 || .000 || .000 || 1.0 || 1.0 || 0.0 || 0.0 || 2.0 || 0.0 
|-
| align="left" | 2022
| align="left" | Seattle
| 1 || 0 || 18.0 || .571 || .667 || 1.000 || 2.0 || 0.0 || 2.0 || 0.0 || 1.0 || 11.0
|-
| align="left" | 2022
| align="left" | Phoenix
| 5 || 0 || 5.4 || .692 || .667 || .750 || 1.2 || 0.0 || 0.0 || 0.0 || 0.6 || 4.6
|-
| align="left" | Career
| align="left" | 5 years, 5 teams
| 102 || 22 || 16.2 || .363 || .338 || .754 || 1.8 || 1.4 || 0.4 || 0.1 || 1.6 || 5.5

Postseason

|-
| align="left" | 2017
| align="left" | Dallas
| 1 || 0 || 3.0 || .000 || .000 || .000 || 0.0 || 0.0 || 0.0 || 0.0 || 0.0 || 0.0
|-
| align="left" | 2022
| align="left" | Phoenix
| 2 || 0 || 23.5 || .483 || .000 || .800 || 3.5 || 1.5 || 0.5 || 0.5 || 1.5 || 16.0
|-
| align="left" | Career
| align="left" | 2 years, 2 teams
| 3 || 0 || 16.7 || .483 || .000 || .800 || 2.3 || 1.0 || 0.3 || 0.3 || 1.0 || 10.7

Overseas career

Galatasaray
In January 2018, Davis joined Turkish team Galatasaray. On 19 November 2021, she signed a one-year contract with Galatasaray.

Personal life
Davis is the daughter of former NBA player Antonio Davis. Davis has a twin brother, A. J., who played basketball at UCF and plays professionally overseas. Davis’s godsister is Candace Parker.

References

External links

Kaela Davis at wnba.com
South Carolina Gamecocks bio
Georgia Tech Yellow Jackets bio

1995 births
Living people
American expatriate basketball people in Turkey
American women's basketball players
Atlanta Dream players
Basketball players from Indianapolis
Dallas Wings draft picks
Dallas Wings players
Chicago Sky players
Seattle Storm players
Galatasaray S.K. (women's basketball) players
Georgia Tech Yellow Jackets women's basketball players
McDonald's High School All-Americans
Shooting guards
Small forwards
South Carolina Gamecocks women's basketball players
Twin sportspeople
Fraternal twins